Jennifer Michelle "Ginnifer" Goodwin (born May 22, 1978) is an American actress. She is known for her starring role as Margene Heffman in the HBO drama series Big Love (2006–2011) and Snow White / Mary Margaret Blanchard in the ABC fantasy series Once Upon a Time (2011–2018).

Goodwin has appeared in various films, including the drama Mona Lisa Smile (2003), the musical biopic Walk the Line (2005), the romantic comedy He's Just Not That Into You (2009), the family comedy Ramona and Beezus (2010), the romantic comedy Something Borrowed (2011), and the biopic Killing Kennedy (2013). She also voiced the lead role of Fawn in the Disney animated fantasy film Tinker Bell and the Legend of the Neverbeast (2014) and Judy Hopps in the Disney animated comedy film Zootopia (2016).

Early life and education
Goodwin was born in Memphis, Tennessee. Her mother, Linda Kantor Goodwin, is a former teacher who also worked for FedEx. Her father, Tim Goodwin, formerly owned and operated a recording studio. Goodwin changed the spelling of her name from "Jennifer" to "Ginnifer" to distinguish her name, and to assist in pronunciation of her name in her regional dialect. Her younger sister, Melissa Goodwin, is a stop-motion animator on shows such as Robot Chicken.

Goodwin's mother is Jewish. Goodwin was raised attending First Unitarian Church and Temple Israel. 

As a child, she attended the Henry S. Jacobs Camp, a summer camp for Reform Jewish children in Utica, Mississippi. She was both baptized and had a bat mitzvah service.

In her youth, Goodwin was affiliated with the North American Federation of Temple Youth, and was active in BBYO at the Jewish Community Center in Memphis. She went to school at St. Mary's Episcopal School in Memphis, Tennessee. She then graduated from Lausanne Collegiate School in 1996, then attended Hanover College (majoring in theater) for one year before moving on to earn her Bachelor of Fine Arts from Boston University. While a student at BU, she performed in numerous student short films, as well as several college and local stage productions. Goodwin was given the "Excellence in Acting: Professional Promise Award" by the Bette Davis Foundation, and graduated with honors. After her time at Boston University, she lived for a time in England and studied at Stratford on Avon's Shakespeare Institute, in conjunction with the Royal Shakespeare Company. The following year, she earned an Acting Shakespeare Certificate from London's Royal Academy of Dramatic Art.

Career

Goodwin first had roles in the NBC television programs Law & Order and Ed before appearing in the Comedy Central television movie Porn 'n Chicken. She later had substantial roles in the films Mona Lisa Smile, Win a Date with Tad Hamilton!, Walk the Line—in which she portrayed Vivian Liberto, Johnny Cash's first wife—and Birds of America. She also played Dori Dumchovic in the dark comedy Love Comes to the Executioner. Goodwin played a leading role as Margene Heffman, the third wife in a polygamous family, on the HBO original series Big Love, which concluded on March 20, 2011. Goodwin has done voice work in the Adult Swim series Robot Chicken, where her younger sister Melissa works as an animator.

In 2008, Max Mara honored Goodwin with a "Face of the Future" award, an award recognizing up-and-coming women in film.

Goodwin played Gigi in He's Just Not That Into You, which was released in February 2009. For this role, she received a nomination for the People's Choice Award for Breakout Movie Actress. In April 2009 she began filming Ramona and Beezus, playing "Aunt Bea". The film was released on July 23, 2010.

From 2011 to 2017, Goodwin played a leading role in the ABC fantasy drama series Once Upon a Time. She played both the fairy tale heroine Snow White and her real-world counterpart, schoolteacher Mary Margaret Blanchard. Goodwin and husband Josh Dallas exited the show at the end of its sixth season to move back to Los Angeles with their family.  They both returned to the series for its finale at the end of the seventh season.

Goodwin voiced Judy Hopps, the protagonist rabbit police officer in Disney's Zootopia, as well as Fawn in Disney's animated film Tinker Bell and the Legend of the Neverbeast. She also voiced Gwen, a kitchen maid who wants to be an inventor, in the animated series Sofia The First.

In January 2017, Goodwin was cast as Marianne in the Los Angeles production of Constellations. The play ran from June 14 to July 23, 2017, at the Geffen Playhouse.

In 2019, Goodwin appeared in episodes of the anthology series The Twilight Zone and Heartstrings. Also in 2019, she starred as Beth Ann in the first season of the CBS All Access dark comedy-drama series Why Women Kill.

Goodwin played Jodie in the Fox comedy series Pivoting, which premiered on January 9, 2022. The show was cancelled after one season.

Personal life

Goodwin dated actor Joey Kern and they became engaged in December 2010. They ended the engagement in May 2011. Goodwin subsequently began dating her Once Upon a Time co-star Josh Dallas in late 2011. They got engaged in October 2013 and married on April 12, 2014 in California. They have two sons, born in May 2014 and June 2016.

In 2013, Goodwin said that after leaving Memphis, she "up and left Judaism for a very long time," and that "for 10 years, there was nothing. No ritual. No tradition. No community." She later reconnected with her faith, and has said, "I was a Jew by birth, and now I'm a Jew by choice."

Filmography

Film

Television

Video games
 Disney Infinity 3.0 (2015), as Judy Hopps (voice role)

Theater
 Constellations (2017) at Geffen Playhouse, as Marianne

Awards and nominations

Notes

References

External links

 
 

1978 births
21st-century American actresses
Actresses from Memphis, Tennessee
Alumni of the London Academy of Music and Dramatic Art
American film actresses
American people of English descent
American people of Jewish descent
American people of Welsh descent
American television actresses
American voice actresses
American Shakespearean actresses
American stage actresses
American Unitarians
Boston University College of Fine Arts alumni
Hanover College alumni
Lausanne Collegiate School alumni
Living people